Baldy Mesa is a summit whose tallest peaks on its southern extremity, overlook the upper Cajon Canyon in San Bernardino County, California. Its tallest point is an unnamed 4,964 foot high hill on the southwest end of the mesa overlooking the upper Cajon Canyon. The mesa descends gradually in elevation to the north, toward the distant Mohave River. it is bounded on the east by the Oro Grande Wash.

References

Landforms of San Bernardino County, California
Mojave Desert
San Bernardino Mountains